Jan Høiland (6 February 1939, Stavanger, Norway – 7 June 2017, Sweden) was a Norwegian singer, who lived for many years in Harstad. The song "Tiotusen röda rosor" by Thore Skogman was Høiland's biggest hit. He scored several chart successes in Norway.

Accompanied by Finn Våland on piano, he made his debut at Cafe Inger in Stavanger in 1957, followed by his record debut "Det vil komme av seg selv"/"Dormi-dormi-dormi" (1958), on Columbia.

References

External links
 Jan Høiland profile, mic.no/nmi.nsf; accessed 9 June 2017. 

Norwegian pop musicians
Melodi Grand Prix contestants
Musicians from Stavanger
1939 births
2017 deaths
Musicians from Harstad